Split Mountain is a fourteener in the Sierra Nevada of the U.S. state of California, near the southeast end of the Palisades group of peaks.

Geography and Geology 
Split Mountain's twin summits lie on a north–south running section of the Sierra Crest. This same line of ridges divides Fresno County and Kings Canyon National Park to the west, from Inyo County and the Inyo National Forest to the east. Precipitation falling on the Crest drains to the Kings River to the west, and the Owens River to the east.

The two-toned appearance of the mountain's eastern face is created by a roof pendant of darker colored granodiorite atop a lighter colored body of leucogranite.

History
The name Split Mountain, inspired by the shape of its double summit, was first coined by mountaineer Bolton Brown in 1895. Alternately, it has been called Southeast Palisade or South Palisade.

Climbing
Split Mountain is one of the easier California fourteeners to climb. The least technical route is the class 2 north slope, which can be approached from the west—where the slope is accessible from the John Muir Trail as it descends from Mather Pass—or the east. Joseph LeConte, Helen LeConte and Curtis Lindley took the simple western approach from Upper Basin when they climbed Split Mountain on July 23, 1902. A more common route to the north face is from the east, by way of Red Lake. From here, another  of cross-country climbing, including a short class 3 ridge traverse, leads to the summit.

There are many more technical routes up both the north and south peaks of Split Mountain.

See also
 List of mountain peaks of California
 List of California fourteeners
 The Palisades of the Sierra Nevada

References

External links
 

Fourteeners of California
Mountains of Kings Canyon National Park
Mountains of the John Muir Wilderness
Mountains of Fresno County, California
Mountains of Inyo County, California
Mountains of Northern California